The División de Honor de Rugby is Spain's top level professional men's rugby union competition. The División de Honor de Rugby Championship is organised by the Federación Española de Rugby (Spanish Rugby Federation) and currently consists of 12 teams. 

The last-placed team in the competition is relegated at the end of the season to the División de Honor B, Spain`s second level of men's rugby union. The team finishing 11th enters a relegation/promotion playoff with the runner-up from the Division de Honor B playoffs.

Format
The División de Honor season takes place between September and May, with every team playing each other home and away for a total of 22 matches. Points are awarded according to the following:
4 points for a win
2 points for a draw
1 bonus point is awarded to a team scoring 4 tries or more in a match
1 bonus point is awarded to a team that loses a match by 7 points or fewer

The six teams with the highest number of points at the end of 22 rounds of matches play the championship playoffs. The top two teams win a semi-final berth automatically, while the next four teams participate in semi-final play-off to take the remaining two spots.

Promotion and relegation
The bottom team in the standings is relegated to the División de Honor B, while the team finishing 11th plays in the promotion/relegation playoff against a team from the second tier of rugby union in Spain. 

The top team from the División de Honor B is promoted to the División de Honor.

Current Teams

Performance by year
The following table shows the teams' final league positions in each season. The playoff champions - not necessarily the team finishing first in the league - are highlighted in gold, except in 1979 when the championship was shared.

Past winners

Titles by team

See also
División de Honor B de Rugby
Copa del Rey de Rugby
Supercopa de España de Rugby
Copa Ibérica de Rugby/Taça Iberica de Rugby
División de Honor Femenina de Rugby
Rugby union in Spain

External links
 Official website

 

División de Honor de Rugby
Sports leagues established in 1953
1953 establishments in Spain
Professional sports leagues in Spain
2
Spain
Spain